Branch Brook Park is a light rail station in the Forest Hill neighborhood of Newark, Essex County, New Jersey. The station services trains of the Newark Light Rail, operated by NJ Transit and is the last in the city of Newark heading westbound. The next station to the west is Silver Lake in Belleville. The next station to the south is Davenport Avenue. Branch Brook Park operates as an intermodal transportation hub, with two platforms for the light rail, one side platform and one island platform. There is also a third platform for bus services.

The station is located on the site of the original Newark City Subway streetcar loop and station known as Franklin Avenue. In 2001, NJ Transit replaced the loop, Franklin Avenue station and the nearby Heller Parkway station into one straight facility known as Branch Brook Park, named after the nearby park.

History

Heller Parkway

Heller Parkway station was originally opened on May 26, 1935, and was the northern terminus of the Newark City Subway system until 1940 when North Sixth Street station was built. Heller Parkway station continued to operate until June 21, 2002. Access to the Heller Parkway bridge is available through a long ramp between the bridge and the south end of one of the platforms.

Franklin Avenue

Originally known as North Sixth Street Newark City Subway station, it was built in 1940. Later as the turning loop was built, the station was moved closer to Anthony Street and named Franklin Avenue NCS station in 1953. When New Jersey Transit replaced the PCC cars with longer and more modern Kinki Sharyo light rail vehicles, Franklin Avenue station was closed on August 25, 2001, and replaced with an elongated ramp leading to the current station.

References

External links

 Heller Parkway entrance from Google Maps Street View
 Branch Brook Park and former Franklin Avenue and Heller Parkway stations (WorldNYCSubway.org)

Newark Light Rail stations
Railway stations in the United States opened in 2001